James "Jamie" Larry Boles Jr. (born January 16, 1961) is a former Republican member of the North Carolina House of Representatives. He represented the 52nd district (which includes most of Moore County) from 2009 to 2023. A funeral home owner from Whispering Pines, North Carolina, Boles previously served as one of the Deputy Majority Whips.

Life and career
Boles graduated from Sandhills Community College and graduated from Cincinnati College of Mortuary Science in 1982. He established Boles Funeral Homes and Crematory, Inc., in Moore County, North Carolina, in 1984.

Committee assignments

2021-2022 Session
Appropriations (Vice Chair)
Appropriations - Justice and Public Safety Committee (Senior Chair)
Alcoholic Beverage Control (Vice Chair)
State Government (Vice Chair)
Homeland Security, Military, and Veterans Affairs 
Local Government 
Rules, Calendar, and Operations of the House
Transportation

2019-2020 Session
Appropriations (Vice Chair)
Appropriations - Justice and Public Safety (Senior Chair)
Alcoholic Beverage Control (Chair)
State and Local Government 
Homeland Security, Military, and Veterans Affairs
Rules, Calendar, and Operations of the House 
Transportation

2017-2018 Session
Appropriations (Vice Chair)
Appropriations on Justice and Public Safety (Chair)
Alcoholic Beverage Control (Chair)
State and Local Government II
Rules, Calendar, and Operations of the House
Transportation
Commerce and Job Development
Ethics

2015-2016 Session
Appropriations (Vice Chair)
Appropriations - Information Technology
Appropriations - Justice and Public Safety (Chair)
Alcoholic Beverage Control (Chair)
Local Government
Rules, Calendar, and Operations of the House
Transportation
Commerce and Job Development
Ethics
Insurance

2013-2014 Session
Appropriations (Vice Chair)
Government (Vice Chair)
Homeland Security, Military, and Veterans Affairs
Rules, Calendar, and Operations of the House
Transportation
Commerce and Job Development
Ethics

2011-2012 Session
Appropriations
Government (Vice Chair)
Transportation
Commerce and Job Development
State Personnel

2009-2010 Session
Appropriations
Commerce, Small Business, and Entrepreneurship
Local Government I
Aging
Water Resources and Infrastructure

Electoral history

2022

2020

2018

2016

2014

2012

2010

2008

References

Living people
1961 births
People from Moore County, North Carolina
Cincinnati College of Mortuary Science alumni
Republican Party members of the North Carolina House of Representatives
21st-century American politicians